No. 110 Squadron RAF was a unit of the British Royal Air Force, initially formed as a bomber squadron during the First World War. Re-formed during the Second World War, again as a bomber squadron, it was re-formed twice more post-war, firstly as a transport, and then a helicopter squadron, before being disbanded in 1971.

History

Formation and the First World War

No. 110 Squadron RFC was formed on 1 November 1917, at Rendcomb, Gloucestershire, and was equipped with B.E.2c aircraft. The squadron moved to Kenley the following year and re-equipped with the DH.9A – the first squadron to operate this aircraft. Its original complement of DH.9As were the gift of His Exalted Highness, the Nizam of Hyderabad. Each aircraft bore an inscription to that effect, and the unit became known as the 'Hyderabad' Squadron in the newly formed Royal Air Force. The squadron arrived in France in September 1918 and formed part of the Independent Air Force, engaged in the bombing offensive against Germany, and later disbanded on 27 August 1919.

Reformation and the Second World War
The squadron reformed on 18 May 1937 at Waddington, equipped first with Hawker Hinds and then Bristol Blenheims. In 1937 No. 88 Squadron was reformed with personnel drawn from 110 Squadron. In 1939, 110 Squadron was posted to Wattisham along with No. 107 Squadron. On 4 September 1939 Nos. 110 and 107 Squadron led the first RAF raid of the war against Wilhelmshaven. The squadron was mainly involved in anti-shipping strikes during the early part of the war, before being posted to India in March 1942. Later that year the squadron converted to the Vultee Vengeance which it operated until November 1944 when it re-equipped with the de Havilland Mosquito. The squadron disbanded at Labuan on 15 April 1946.

Post War on Dakotas and Valettas
The squadron reformed again on 1 June 1946 at RAF Kai Tak via the renumbering of No. 96 Squadron, and was equipped with Douglas Dakotas. In 1948, the squadron took part in Operation Firedog during the Malayan emergency. In October 1951, the squadron converted to the Vickers Valetta which it operated until disbanding on 31 December 1957.

On helicopters
On 3 June 1959, 110 Squadron was reformed at Kuala Lumpur from the merger of No. 155 Squadron and No. 194 Squadron, initially equipped with the Westland Whirlwind HC.4. These were in April 1960 supplemented by the Bristol Sycamore HR.14 with the Whirlwinds being replaced by the much more capable Gnome-engined Whirlwind HAR.10s in July 1963, the Sycamores being finally retired in October 1964. From 1963 the squadron also operated in Brunei and Borneo until November 1967 during the Indonesian Crisis. It then continued its normal duties in Malaya, until the Far East Air Force was run-down. The squadron disbanded on 15 February 1971.

Aircraft operated

References

Citations

Bibliography

 Barker, Ralph. Down in the Drink [Chapter 2 titled Chas]. London: Chatto and Windus 1955. No ISBN known.
 Bell, Flight Lieutenant Elwyn D. Hyderabad Squadron: The Story of No. 110 (Hyderabad) Squadron Royal Air Force. Stone Cottage, Great Sampford, Saffron Walden, Essex: Air-Britain (Historians) Ltd., 1971. .
 Halley, James J. The Squadrons of the Royal Air Force & Commonwealth 1918–1988. Tonbridge, Kent, UK: Air Britain (Historians) Ltd., 1988. .
 Jefford, C.G. RAF Squadrons, a Comprehensive record of the Movement and Equipment of all RAF Squadrons and their Antecedents since 1912. Shropshire, UK: Airlife Publishing, 1988 (second edition 2001). .
 Mosher, Sara V. REMEMBER ME - No. 110 (HYDERABAD) SQUADRON. Winnipeg: S.V.Mosher, c2010. .
 Moyes, Philip J.R. Bomber Squadrons of the RAF and their Aircraft. London: Macdonald and Jane's (Publishers) Ltd., 2nd edition 1976. .
 Rawlings, John D.R. Coastal, Support and Special Squadrons of the RAF and their Aircraft. London: Jane's Publishing Company Ltd., 1982. .

External links

 History of No.'s 106–110 Squadrons at RAF Web
 Aircraft and markings of No. 110 squadron on Raf Web
 110 Squadron history on official RAF website

110
110
Military units and formations established in 1917
1917 establishments in England
Military units and formations disestablished in 1971